The Argus As III was a six-cylinder, in-line, water-cooled, aircraft engine produced in Germany by Argus Motoren during World War I. The Argus As III produced  at 1,400 rpm.

Design and development

Argus Motoren already supplied a limited number 150 hp and 200 hp aircraft engines to the Imperial German Navy in the Summer of 1914.
As these engines did not prove successful Argus decided to concentrate its development efforts on an improved  six-cylinder type which became accepted into service in January 1916 as the Argus As III.
License production of the engine was ordered at Deutz, Güldner, M.A.N., Opel and Stoewer.
First operational experience with the engine however proved troublesome, with overheating problems occurring among other things.
These problems were only solved after several improvements of the engine and so it took until the end of 1917 for the engine to attain its full operational maturity.

Applications
AEG C.IV
Albatros B.II
Albatros C.I
Albatros C.III
Gotha G.IV
Hannover CL.II
Hannover CL.IIIa
LFG Roland D.II
LFG Roland D.III
Rumpler C.I
Rumpler C.VIII
Sablatnig C.I

Specifications

See also

References

Notes

Bibliography 

Jane's Fighting Aircraft of World War I. London. Studio Editions Ltd, 1993. p. 258. 

1910s aircraft piston engines
As III